()  is an Arabic term meaning "god". In Arabic, ilah refers to anyone or anything that is worshipped. The Arabic word for God is thought to be derived from it (in a proposed earlier form al-Lāh) though this is disputed.  is cognate to Northwest Semitic  and Akkadian ilum. The word is from a Proto-Semitic archaic biliteral  meaning "god" (possibly with a wider meaning of "strong"), which was extended to a regular triliteral by the addition of a h (as in Hebrew). The word is spelled either  with an optional diacritic alif to mark the  only in Qur'anic texts or (more rarely) with a full alif, .

The term is used throughout the Quran in passages discussing the existence of God or the beliefs in other divinities by non-Muslims.

See also
Al-Lat
El (deity)
Elohim
Arabian mythology
Dingir

Sources
Georgii Wilhelmi Freytagii, Lexicon Arabico-Latinum. Librairie du Liban, Beirut, 1975.
J. Milton Cowan, The Hans Wehr Dictionary of Modern Written Arabic. 4th edn. Spoken Language Services, Ithaca (NY), 1979.
References

External links

Islamic terminology
Arabian deities
Arabian mythology
Allah
Ancient Semitic religions